Cai Yanxiong (26 August 1915 – 29 June 2007) was a Chinese basketball player. He competed in the men's tournament at the 1936 Summer Olympics.

References

External links

1915 births
Year of death missing
Chinese men's basketball players
Olympic basketball players of China
Basketball players at the 1936 Summer Olympics
Cai Yanxiong
Republic of China men's national basketball team players